Tuzovskiy, sometimes transliterated as Tuzovsky may refer to:

 Tuzovskiy (volcano), Russia
 Roman Tuzovskiy (born 1985), Russian footballer